Rob Smith is an English DJ, musician and remixer from Bristol, England. Previously on the now defunct Grand Central Records independent record label, playing breakbeat hip-hop, dub and reggae-influenced music, more recently producing dubstep tracks as RSD on a number of labels.

Smith was formerly a drum & bass/jungle DJ, most notably alongside Ray Mighty and Peter D Rose in Smith & Mighty on the !K7 Records label. Smith and Rose also produced music under the moniker of More Rockers.

Discography 
Solo
 Up on the Downs (Oct 2003)
With More Rockers
 Dub Plate Selection Volume One (1995)
 Selection 2 (1998)
 Select Cuts from More Rockers 12" Selection (2001)
With Jaz Klash
 Thru the Haze (1996)
With Smith & Mighty
 Bass Is Maternal (1995)
 DJ-Kicks: Smith & Mighty (March 1998) (DJ mix album)
 Big World Small World (Jan 2000)
 Life Is... (Apr 2002)
 Retrospective (2005)

 Discography as RSD With Punch Drunk'''
"Corner Dub (Blue and Red Mix)/Pretty Bright Light"

References

External links 
Studio !K7 site
Dub from Atlantis

Year of birth missing (living people)
Living people
English DJs
English electronic musicians
Musicians from Bristol
Remixers